John Francis Kiely (born October 4, 1964) is an American former Major League Baseball pitcher who played for the Detroit Tigers from  to .

Biography
A native of Boston, Massachusetts, Kiely attended Brockton High School and Bridgewater State College. In 1987, he played collegiate summer baseball with the Wareham Gatemen of the Cape Cod Baseball League.

Kiely signed with the Detroit Tigers as an amateur free agent in 1987 and made his major league debut for Detroit in 1991. He enjoyed his most productive season in 1992 when he posted a 4–2 record with a 2.13 ERA over 39 appearances for the Tigers.

References

External links

1964 births
Living people
Baseball players from Boston
Bridgewater State Bears baseball players
Detroit Tigers players
Major League Baseball pitchers
Wareham Gatemen players
American expatriate baseball players in Mexico
Arizona League Brewers players
Bristol Tigers players
Lakeland Tigers players
London Tigers players
Toledo Mud Hens players